Veslemøy's Song is a 2018 Canadian dramatic short film directed by Sofia Bohdanowicz. A continuation of her 2016 film Never Eat Alone, the film stars Deragh Campbell as Audrey Benac, a young woman attempting to research and recover the history of a largely forgotten female violinist and composer, Kathleen Parlow, who had taught Audrey's grandfather.

The film premiered at the Locarno Film Festival on August 7, 2018. It screened at the 2018 Toronto International Film Festival, and was named by the festival to its annual year-end Canada's Top Ten list.

Cast 
 Deragh Campbell as Audrey Benac
 Joan Benac as herself
 Steve Benac as himself

Production 
Campbell portrays Audrey Benac, a character she has played for Bohdanowicz in the films Never Eat Alone (2016) and MS Slavic 7 (2019).

Bohdanowicz has indicated that she has plans to expand the film into a feature film.

References

External links 
 

2018 films
2018 short films
2018 drama films
Films directed by Sofia Bohdanowicz
2010s English-language films
Canadian drama short films
2010s Canadian films